Liu Yanni (born 11 June 1999) is a Chinese tennis player.

She has a career-high WTA singles ranking of 685, achieved on 14 January 2019, and a best doubles ranking of world No. 527, reached on 31 December 2018.

Liu made her WTA Tour main-draw debut at the 2018 Jiangxi International in the doubles tournament, partnering Yuan Yue.

References

External links
 
 

1999 births
Living people
Chinese female tennis players
21st-century Chinese women